Digit is the second EP released by Echobelly. 3 of the 4 songs were rerecorded and released on their fourth album People Are Expensive.

Track listing

Credits
Bass – Simon Robinson
Drums – Andy Henderson 
Guitar – Glenn Johansson
Voice – Sonya Madan
Piano – Ken Campbell
Recorded by – Dick Meaney
Mastered by – Bunt
Cover Art – Maria Mochnacz
Producer – Ben Hillier

References

External links 
 https://www.discogs.com/Echobelly-Digit/release/2447107

2000 EPs
Echobelly albums
Albums produced by Ben Hillier